Mae Louise Miller (born Mae Louise Wall; August 24, 19432014) was an American woman who was kept in modern-day slavery, known as peonage, near Gillsburg, Mississippi and Kentwood, Louisiana until her family achieved freedom in early 1961.

Mae's story was unearthed when she spoke to historian Antoinette Harrell, who highlighted it in the short documentary The Untold Story: Slavery in the 20th Century (2009). The story inspired the 2022 film Alice.

In 2003, Mae and all six of her siblings joined a class action lawsuit seeking reparations to descendants of enslaved people from several private companies with lawyer Deadria Farmer-Paellmann. Mae stated to NPR that "maybe I wasn't free, but maybe it can free somebody else. There's a lot of people out there that's really enslaved and don't know how to get out." In 2004, a judge dropped the lawsuit.

Childhood in peonage 

Historian Antoinette Harrell believes that Miller's father Cain Wall lost his own farmland after he signed a contract that he could not read which indebted him to a local plantation owner. The Wall family was forced to do fieldwork and housework for several white families attending the same church on the Louisiana-Mississippi border: the Gordon family, the McDaniel family, and the Wall family (no relation). Peon owners used the violent coercion akin to that of slavery to force black people to work off imagined debts with unpaid labor. Peons couldn't leave their owner's land without permission, which made it nearly impossible for them to pay their debt.

Like most peons, the Wall family was not permitted to leave the land, was illiterate, and were under the impression that "all black people were being treated like that". They were repeatedly beaten by plantation owners, often including whips or chains. Mae's sister Annie Wall recounted that "the whip would wrap around your body and knock you down". The Wall family was not paid in money or in kind with food: "They beat us. They didn't feed us. We had to go drink water out of the creek." The Wall family ate wild animals and leftovers that were "raked all up in a dishpan", "like slop". "They treated the dogs a whole lot better than they treated us." Mae recounted harvesting cotton, corn, peas, butter beans, string beans, potatoes. "Whatever it was, that's what you did for no money at all".

Mae alleges that, starting at 5 years old, she was repeatedly raped along with her mother by the white men of the Gordon family. Miller would get sent to the landowner's house and "raped by whatever men were present". Mae recounted that she was threatened with violence to keep this abuse secret from her father: "They told me, 'If you go down there and tell [your father, Cain Wall Sr.], we will kill him before the morning.' I knew there wasn't anyone who could help me."

Mae said she didn't run for a long time because, "What could you run to? We thought everybody was in the same predicament." Mae recounted first running away at 9 years old, but she was returned to the farm by her brothers, where her father told her that if she ran away, "they'll kill us." The Wall family obtained their freedom in 1961, which is sometimes inaccurately given as 1962 or 1963. Then 18, Mae refused to do housework for another family in Kentwood, LA, and ran away after the owner threatened to kill her. "I remember thinking they're just going to have to kill me today, because I'm not doing this anymore." In early 1961, an aunt of Mae's from northern Alabama "sneaked us away" on a "horse and wagon" and helped them to relocate.

No legal documentation has yet been found to document the atrocities that Mae describes. However, her situation was hardly unique: White landowners used threats of violence worked with law enforcement to keep people in peonage. Smithsonian Institution historian Pete Daniel noted that "white people had the power to hold blacks down, and they weren't afraid to use it -- and they were brutal". Historian Antoinette Harrell said that in some districts, "the sheriff, the constable, all of them work together. So [peons] had no outlet to talk to anyone under peonage". Harrell talked "to many [people] throughout Louisiana that was afraid for their lives, so they wouldn't talk about being held in slavery." Ron Walters, a scholar of African-American politics, noted that letters archived by the NAACP "tell us that in a lot of these places, that [people] were kept in bondage or semi-bondage conditions in the 20th century — [in] out-of-the way places, certainly where the law authorities didn't pay much attention to what was going on." Mae said that they didn't know their peonage was illegal; "matter of fact, I thought everybody was living that way". Mae said that the Wall family's world was "confined from one [plantation] to the other. They trade you off, they come back and get you, from one day to the next." Annie Wall recounted that the plantation owners said "you better not tell because we'll kill 'em, kill all of you, you n****rs". Mae recalled that the plantation owners "have the capability of killing you" and that "we had been beat so much and had been threatened so many times you really didn't know who to tell."

When contacted in 2007, a Gordon family member denied Miller's claims. Durwood Gordon, who was younger than 12 when the Wall family worked on the Gordon farm, claimed that the family worked for his uncle Willie Gordon (d. 1950s) and cousin William Gordon (d. 1991). "I just remember [Cain Sr.] was a jolly type, smiling every time I saw him." Durwood also denied Miller's claims of rape: "No way, knowing my uncle the way I do. I knew him to be good people, good folks, Christian."

Mae called the experience "pure-D hell", saying, "I feel like my whole life has been taken". Harrell believes the family suffered PTSD from their experiences.

Life after freedom 

In 1963, Mae married Wallace Miller and sought to start a family. A doctor told Mae that she was infertile, possibly from being raped. Instead, Mae adopted four children. In her 30s, Mae returned to school and learned to read and write. In the 1970s, she became a glass-cutter. In 2001, Mae attended a slavery reparations campaign meeting that she had thought was a lecture on black history. Only then did the Wall family learn that their peonage status had been illegal.

Annie Wall suggested that shame prevented former peons from coming forward: "Why would you want to tell anybody that you was raped over and all that kind of mess?" Mae suggested that they don't want to relive their experiences, and "they don't wanna carry they minds back there." For Mae, telling her story brought relief: "It might bring some shame to the family, but it's not a big dark secret anymore." Harrell noted that "people are afraid to share their stories" because "many of the same white families who owned these plantations are still running local government and big businesses". Harrell argued that "it just isn't worth the risk" to most former peons, so "most situations of this sort go unreported".

See also 
 Slavery by Another Name

References

External links 
The Cotton Pickin Truth...Still on the Plantation – trailer for documentary about Miller

1943 births
2014 deaths
African-American history of Mississippi
History of African-American civil rights
People from Amite County, Mississippi